Similarity may refer to:

In mathematics and computing
 Similarity (geometry), the property of sharing the same shape
 Matrix similarity, a relation between matrices
 Similarity measure, a function that quantifies the similarity of two objects
 Cosine similarity, which uses the angle between vectors
 String metric, also called string similarity
 Semantic similarity, in computational linguistics

In linguistics
 Lexical similarity
 Semantic similarity

In other fields
 Similitude (model), in engineering, describing the geometric, kinematic and dynamic 'likeness' of two or more systems
 Similarity (psychology)
 Similarity (philosophy)
 Musical similarity
 Chemical similarity
 Similarity (network science)
 Structural similarity
 Similar (film), an upcoming South Korean film

See also
 
 Same (disambiguation)
 Difference (disambiguation)
 Equality (mathematics)
 Identity (philosophy)